The Sea Hunters II: More True Adventures with Famous Shipwrecks is a nonfiction work by adventure novelist Clive Cussler published in the United States in 2002.  This work details the author's continuing search for famous shipwrecks with his nonprofit organization NUMA. There is also a television series  titled The Sea Hunters which is based on the book. It airs on the National Geographic Channel and History Television in Canada.

Synopsis

Adventure novelist Clive Cussler follows up on the success of his first nonfiction book The Sea Hunters: True Adventures With Famous Shipwrecks which documented the formation of his nonprofit organization named after the fictional agency in his novels, the National Underwater and Marine Agency which is dedicated to the discovery of famous shipwrecks around the world.

This volume documents the search for the final resting places of fourteen additional ships or other historical sunken artifacts  not documented in the first work.  Unlike the first book, this volume documents searches for ships that Cussler's group has found, and searches that were ultimately unsuccessful.  As in the first work, preceding the details of the search is a fictionalized imagining of the events that led to the loss of the ship.

Contents

Part 1: L’Aimable (Lost ship of René-Robert Cavelier)
Part 2: The Steamboat New Orleans
Part 3: The Ironclads: Manassas and Louisiana
Part 4: USS Mississippi
Part 5: The Siege of Charleston: Keokuk, Weehawken, and Patapsco
Part 6: The Cannon of San Jacinto
Part 7: Mary Celeste 
Part 8: The Steamboat General Slocum 
Part 9: SS Waratah
Part 10: RMS Carpathia
Part 11: L’Oiseau Blanc (The White Bird, biplane flown by Charles Nungesser and François Coli, who vanished on an attempted transatlantic flight in 1927)
Part 12: USS Akron
Part 13: PT-109
Part 14: The Hunt for Samuel Morey's boat Aunt Sally

Release Details
2002, USA, J.P. Putnam’s Sons 0-399-14925-2, December 7, 2002, Hardcover.
2003, USA, Berkley 0-425-19372-1, December 30, 2003, Paperback.

Notes

External links
The Sea Hunters II - book review

2002 non-fiction books
Archaeology of shipwrecks
Books by Clive Cussler
Collaborative non-fiction books